General Court may refer to:
 General Court (European Union)
 New Hampshire General Court
 Massachusetts General Court
 Cortes Generales, the national parliament of Spain (directly translated as "General Court(s)", though more commonly left untranslated in English-language texts)

Institutions formerly known as General Court include:
 Vermont General Assembly, formerly the Vermont General Court
 Connecticut General Assembly, formerly the Connecticut General Court
 General Court of Virginia (colonial)
 Plymouth General Court